Eucalyptus moderata, also known as redwood mallee, is a species of tree or a mallee that is endemic to the southwest of Western Australia. It has rough, hard, fibrous bark on some or all of the trunk, lance-shaped adult leaves, flower buds usually in groups of seven, pale yellow flowers and pendulous, urn-shaped fruit.

Description
It forms a lignotuber and has glaucous branchlets. The concolorous, dull, blue-green to green adult leaves are arranged alternately. It blooms between September and July producing cream-yellow flowers. Each unbranched axillary inflorescence usually has more than seven pedicellate buds. The buds are scarred with a beaked to horn shaped operculum and pale yellow flowers. The fruits have a descending disc with three or four exserted valves. The brown-grey seeds within the fruit have an ovoid or flattened-ovoid shape.

Taxonomy and naming
Eucalyptus moderata was first formally described in 1991 by the botanists Lawrence Alexander Sidney Johnson and Ken Hill in the journal Telopea. The specific epithet is taken from the Latin word moderatus meaning "moderate" in reference to the medium sized habit and leaves, buds and fruit of the plant compared to its closest relatives.

Distribution
It is found on flats, slopes and road verges in the eastern Wheatbelt and the Goldfields-Esperance region growing in sandy-loamy soils over granite or laterite.

The species is associated with the western mallee subgroup which is characterised by several eucalypts including E. oleosa, E. eremophila, E. incrassata, E. foecunda, E. redunca and E. uncinata. The understorey is predominantly shrubby with species of Melaleuca and Acacia along with the occasional Triodia.

See also
List of Eucalyptus species

References

moderata
Endemic flora of Western Australia
Mallees (habit)
Myrtales of Australia
Eucalypts of Western Australia
Trees of Australia
Plants described in 1999
Taxa named by Lawrence Alexander Sidney Johnson
Taxa named by Ken Hill (botanist)